Robert Reed (1932–1992) was an American stage and television actor.

Robert Reed may also refer to:

 Robert Reed (bishop) (died 1415), bishop in Ireland and England
 Robert Rentoul Reed (1807–1864), American politician, U.S. Representative from Pennsylvania
 Robert H. Reed (born 1929), general in the United States Air Force
 Robert Reed (artist) (1938–2014), American artist
 Bobby Reed (American football) (born 1939), American football player for the Minnesota Vikings and Winnipeg Blue Bombers
 Robert Reed (guard) (born 1943), American football player
 Bob Reed (baseball) (born 1945), American baseball player
 Robert Reed (author) (born 1956), American science fiction author
 Robert Reed, Baron Reed of Allermuir (born 1956), Scottish jurist
 Robert P. Reed (born 1959), American Roman Catholic bishop
 Robert Reed (wide receiver) (born 1975), American football wide receiver
 Rob Reed, keyboardist with Welsh progressive rock band Magenta
 Bobby Reed, a fictional character; see Police of The Wire#Bobby Reed
 Robert "Robby" Reed, fictional character from DC Comics' Dial H for Hero
Bob Reed, bassist for The Trashmen

See also
 Bert Reed (born 1988), American football player
 Robert Read (1814–1896), Canadian businessman and politician
 Robert Read (cricketer) (1870-1945), New Zealand cricketer
 Robert Reid (disambiguation)